University Of Computer Studies, Meiktila, commonly known as UCSMTLA, has been producing the graduates in computer sciences and technology majors called CS and CT. UCSMTLA is located in Meiktila (sometimes called Meikhtila), Mandalay Division, Myanmar.

History
In October 2001, UCS-Mtla was established as government Computer College (GCC). In January 2007, it has been promoted from GCC to University of Computer Studies (Meiktila).

Rule
The students who gets over 400 marks (may be little different for each year) in total of matriculation exams are allowed to attend this university.
The students have to wear the uniform in the colour of white and greenish blue.
The students can take either computer science or technology majors depending on their preferences.
Only the students who have over 75% of total attendance of current academic year are allowed to take their corresponding exam.

Programs
Computer University, Meiktila offers five-year bachelor's degree programs in computer science and computer technology. The school's language of instruction is English.

 
http://www.ucsmtla.edu.mm

http://www.ucsmtla.edu.mm

Universities and colleges in Mandalay Region